Trollryggen is a peak along the Trolltindene ridge along the Romsdalen valley.  It is located in Rauma Municipality in Møre og Romsdal county, Norway.  The Rauma River and the European route E136 highway lie just to the east of the ridge at the bottom of the valley.

The north face of the peak is part of the famous Trollveggen (Troll Wall)—the highest vertical cliff in Europe. It is also a part of Reinheimen National Park.

In 1973 first winter ascent on Trollryggen (North face - Troll Wall) was made by Wojciech Kurtyka with Marek Kęsicki, Ryszard Kowalewski, Tadeusz Piotrowski (all Polish)

See also
List of mountains of Norway

References

Mountains of Møre og Romsdal
Rauma, Norway